The National Reality TV Awards also known as Reality TV Awards or NRTA is an annual award show produced by the IEG Global and National Media Group . The awards show became the first ever awards ceremony to launch in both the UK and US to celebrate the cast and crew from the reality TV industry.

History
National Reality TV Awards (NRTA) was founded in 2011 as an annual awards ceremony celebrating the achievements of established cast and crew from the reality television industry . The NRTA was the first of its kind to re-define the categories that make up Reality Television into specific genres. The National Reality TV Awards UK launched at the O2 Arena in London in 2011 whilst the US version of the awards show National Reality TV Awards USA launched in Los Angeles at the Crescent Hotel, Beverley Hills in 2012.

Annual ceremony

The ceremony takes place annually in September. The awards are voted for by television fans nationwide.

Sponsorship
2016, NBC Universal sponsored the awards

See also

 List of American television awards

References

Official Websites
 

British television awards